Matthew Herbert (by 1537 – 1603), of Coldbrook, Abergavenny, Monmouthshire, was a Welsh politician.

He was a Member (MP) of the Parliament of England for Monmouth Boroughs in 1558 and for Monmouthshire in 1563. He was a justice of the peace for Monmouthshire in 1575–1583 and from 1584 until he died. He was a receiver for the Duchy of Lancaster in Monmouth by 1580 until he died. He was Sheriff of Monmouthshire for the year 1583–84 and in 1594–95. He was the Deputy Lieutenant from October 1595.

Notes

References

1603 deaths
16th-century Welsh politicians
High Sheriffs of Monmouthshire
People from Abergavenny
English MPs 1558
English MPs 1563–1567
Year of birth uncertain